The Glass Mountain or Glass Mountain may refer to:

Mountains in the United States 
Glass Mountain (California)
Glass Mountain (Siskiyou County, California)
Glass Mountain (Utah)
Glass Mountains, a mountain range in Oklahoma, U.S.
Glass Mountains, a mountain range in Brewster and Pecos Counties, Texas, U.S.

Entertainment 
The Glass Mountain (fairy tale), a Polish fairy tale
The Glass Mountain (short story), a short story by Donald Barthelme, inspired by the Polish fairy tale
The Glass Mountain (1949 film), a British film with a famous theme by Nino Rota
The Glass Mountain (1953 film), a Swedish film directed by Gustaf Molander
"The Glass Mountain" (pulp), is the 6th pulp magazine story to feature The Avenger
 The Glass Mountain (novel), a 2002 novel by Jessica Rydill
Glass Mountain, a 1991 novel by Cynthia Voigt
Glass Mountain (album), by the rock band Roadstar 
Glass Mountain ("Glasberg" in the original German), a mythical location in the Brothers Grimm fairy tale "The Seven Ravens"
Glass Mountain (magazine), the undergraduate literary magazine of the University of Houston